The Pasadena Open was a golf tournament on the PGA Tour from 1929 to 1938, held at the Brookside Golf Course in Pasadena, California.

Winners
1938 (Jan.) Henry Picard
1936–37 No tournament
1935 (Dec.) Horton Smith (2)
1934 Harold "Jug" McSpaden
1933 Paul Runyan
1932 Craig Wood (2)
1931 Harry Cooper
1930 Tony Manero
1929 Horton Smith
1929 (Jan.) Craig Wood

References

Former PGA Tour events
Golf in California
Sports competitions in Pasadena, California